George Werheim, Sr. (January 6, 1834 – August 27, 1925) was an American politician and businessman.

Born in Hesse-Darmstadt, Germany, Werheim emigrated to the United States in 1852. He worked as a carpenter in Chicago, Illinois and then moved to Wausau, Wisconsin in 1855. He owned a manufacturing company. Werheim served as a village trustee for Wausau, Wisconsin became a city and then on the Wausau Common Council. He also served as city treasurer, under sheriff, and as coroner for Marathon County, Wisconsin. Werheim served in the Wisconsin State Assembly from 1895 to 1896 and 1899 to 1900. He was a Republican.

Notes

1834 births
1925 deaths
German emigrants to the United States
Politicians from Wausau, Wisconsin
Businesspeople from Wisconsin
County officials in Wisconsin
Wisconsin city council members
Republican Party members of the Wisconsin State Assembly